The 2002–03 NBA season was the Bucks' 35th season in the National Basketball Association. For the first time since 1993–94 season, Glenn Robinson was not on the opening day roster. During the off-season, the Bucks acquired Toni Kukoč from the Atlanta Hawks. In a year of transition, the Bucks played mediocre basketball with a 14–20 start, but then won 13 of their next 16 games, and held a 25–23 record at the All-Star break. In February 2003, just before the trading deadline, the Bucks dealt 3-time All-Star shooting guard Ray Allen to the Seattle SuperSonics in exchange for 34 year-old All-Star point guard Gary Payton and Desmond Mason. The Bucks won eight of their final nine games finishing fourth in the Central Division with a 42–40 record.

Sam Cassell averaged 19.7 points and 5.8 assists per game, while Michael Redd continued to show improvement averaging 15.1 points per game, and Tim Thomas provided the team with 13.3 points and 4.9 rebounds per game. In addition, Kukoč contributed 11.6 points and 1.3 steals per game off the bench, and Anthony Mason provided with 7.2 points and 6.4 rebounds per game.

However, the Bucks did not make it out of the first round of the playoffs, losing 2–4 to the New Jersey Nets in the Eastern Conference First Round. The Nets would reach the Finals for the second consecutive year, but would lose in six games to the San Antonio Spurs. Following the season, Payton signed as a free agent with the Los Angeles Lakers, while Cassell and Ervin Johnson were both traded to the Minnesota Timberwolves, head coach George Karl was fired, and Mason retired.

Draft picks

Roster

Regular season

Season standings

Record vs. opponents

Game log

|-style="background:#fcc;"
| 1 || October 30, 2002 || @ Philadelphia
| L 93–95
|
|
|
| First Union Center19,569
| 0–1

|-style="background:#fcc;"
| 2 || November 2, 2002 || Orlando
| L 90–100
|Michael Redd (17)
|Toni Kukoc (12)
|Kevin Ollie (5)
| Bradley Center16,713
| 0–2
|-style="background:#ccffcc;"
| 3 || November 4, 2002 || @ New York
| W 97–88
|
|Dan Gadzuric (10)
|
| Madison Square Garden18,100
| 1–2
|-style="background:#ccffcc;"
| 4 || November 6, 2002 || New Jersey
| W 99–93
|
|
|
| Bradley Center14,539
| 2–2
|-style="background:#fcc;"
| 5 || November 7, 2002 || @ Minnesota
| L 110–114
|
|
|
| Target Center14,776
| 2–3
|-style="background:#ccffcc;"
| 6 || November 9, 2002 || Philadelphia
| W 110–105
|
|
|
| Bradley Center16,782
| 3–3
|-style="background:#ccffcc;"
| 7 || November 13, 2002 || Chicago
| W 108–101
|
|
|
| Bradley Center14,036
| 4–3
|-style="background:#fcc;"
| 8 || November 15, 2002 || @ Indiana
| L 100–103
|
|
|
| Conseco Fieldhouse16,010
| 4–4
|-style="background:#ccffcc;"
| 9 || November 16, 2002 || Boston
| W 104–85
|
|
|
| Bradley Center18,717
| 5–4
|-style="background:#fcc;"
| 10 || November 19, 2002 || Miami
| L 93–97
|
|
|
| Bradley Center13,632
| 5–5
|-style="background:#ccffcc;"
| 11 || November 22, 2002 || @ Golden State
| W 95–91
|
|
|
| The Arena in Oakland12,170
| 6–5
|-style="background:#fcc;"
| 12 || November 24, 2002 || @ L. A. Lakers
| L 99–111
|
|
|
| STAPLES Center18,997
| 6–6
|-style="background:#fcc;"
| 13 || November 25, 2002 || @ Phoenix
| L 81–86
|
|
|
| America West Arena12,986
| 6–7

Playoffs

|- align="center" bgcolor="#ffcccc"
| 1
| April 19
| @ New Jersey
| L 96–109
| Tim Thomas (25)
| Desmond Mason (8)
| Gary Payton (10)
| Continental Airlines Arena16,102
| 0–1
|- align="center" bgcolor="#ccffcc"
| 2
| April 22
| @ New Jersey
| W 88–85
| Gary Payton (22)
| Anthony Mason (8)
| Gary Payton (7)
| Continental Airlines Arena17,633
| 1–1
|- align="center" bgcolor="#ffcccc"
| 3
| April 24
| New Jersey
| L 101–103
| Sam Cassell (24)
| Tim Thomas (11)
| Gary Payton (8)
| Bradley Center17,539
| 1–2
|- align="center" bgcolor="#ccffcc"
| 4
| April 26
| New Jersey
| W 119–114 (OT)
| Toni Kukoč (23)
| Desmond Mason (8)
| Gary Payton (14)
| Bradley Center18,391
| 2–2
|- align="center" bgcolor="#ffcccc"
| 5
| April 29
| @ New Jersey
| L 82–89
| Toni Kukoč (18)
| Desmond Mason (12)
| Gary Payton (5)
| Continental Airlines Arena16,601
| 2–3
|- align="center" bgcolor="#ffcccc"
| 6
| May 1
| New Jersey
| L 101–113
| Gary Payton (24)
| Tim Thomas (6)
| Gary Payton (8)
| Bradley Center18,717
| 2–4
|-

Player statistics
Source:

Season

Playoffs

Awards and records
 George Karl, Coach of the Month in January

Transactions

Overview

Trades

Free Agents

Player Transactions Citation:

References

See also
 2002–03 NBA season

Milwaukee Bucks seasons
Milwaukee Bucks
Milwaukee Bucks
Milwaukee